Pak Song-gwan (born 14 August 1980) is a North Korean international football player.

Pak appeared for the Korea DPR national football team in two 2006 FIFA World Cup qualifying matches.

Goals for Senior National Team

References

External links

1980 births
Living people
North Korean footballers
North Korea international footballers
Rimyongsu Sports Club players
Footballers at the 2002 Asian Games
Association football midfielders
Asian Games competitors for North Korea